Mallard Creek is a  long 3rd order tributary to the Rocky River in Cabarrus County, North Carolina.

Course
Mallard Creek rises in a pond on the northside of Charlotte, North Carolina and then flows easterly through the northern suburbs of Charlotte into Cabarrus County to join the Rocky River in Harrisburg.

Watershed
Mallard Creek drains  of area, receives about 46.5 in/year of precipitation, has a wetness index of 417.80, and is about 22% forested.

References

External links
Online Brochure about Mallard Creek

Rivers of North Carolina
Rivers of Cabarrus County, North Carolina
Rivers of Mecklenburg County, North Carolina